Bo Petersson (born 10 July 1946 in Kalmar) is a Swedish football manager and former football player.

Career
He played for Älvsjö AIK, Råsunda IS, Spårvägens FF, Vasalunds IF, AIK, IFK Östersund, Visby AIK and Danderyds SK.

After he retired from playing he later went into coaching. He coached Spårvägens FF, IFK Östersund, AIK, IFK Östersund, Vasalunds IF, Tromsø IL, Djurgårdens IF, IF Brommapojkarna, FC Plavi Team, PAE Kalamata, Västerås SK, Enköpings SK, Assyriska, PAS Giannina and Vasalund/Essinge IF. Nowadays, Petersson works as an expert at the TV channel Viasat.

Bo Petersson is the son of Ingvar Petersson.

References

1946 births
People from Kalmar
Living people
Swedish footballers
Älvsjö AIK players
Vasalunds IF players
AIK Fotboll players
IFK Östersund players
Allsvenskan players
Swedish football managers
AIK Fotboll managers
IF Brommapojkarna managers
Djurgårdens IF Fotboll managers
Västerås SK Fotboll managers
Expatriate football managers in Greece
Swedish expatriate sportspeople in Greece
PAS Giannina F.C. managers
Swedish expatriate football managers
Swedish expatriate sportspeople in Norway
Expatriate football managers in Norway
Tromsø IL managers
Vasalunds IF managers
Association football midfielders
Sportspeople from Kalmar County